
Gmina Kaźmierz is a rural gmina (administrative district) in Szamotuły County, Greater Poland Voivodeship, in west-central Poland.

Villages
Gmina Kaźmierz contains the villages and settlements of Brzezno, Bytyń, Chlewiska, Dolne Pole, Gaj Wielki, Gorszewice, Kaźmierz, Kiączyn, Komorowo, Kopanina, Młodasko, Nowa Wieś, Piersko, Pólko, Radzyny, Sierpówko, Sokolniki Małe, Sokolniki Wielkie and Witkowice.

Neighbouring gminas
Gmina Kaźmierz is bordered by the gminas of Duszniki, Rokietnica, Szamotuły and Tarnowo Podgórne.

References
 Polish official population figures 2006

Kazmierz
Szamotuły County